7th Bengaluru International Film Festival 2014 (BIFFES 2014) was inaugurated by the honorable Chief Minister of Karnataka,  Siddaramaiah  on 4 December 2014 in Bengaluru. The film festival is  showcasing 175 films from 45 countries in 11 screens across the City from 4 to 11 December.

Participation
Bengaluru International film festival attracts people of all ages, Film industry people, students. Many of the colleges encouraged their students to participate or volunteer for the festival. Jain University, NMKRV College, St Joseph's College, Central College,  National School of Drama's Bengaluru chapter are some of the institutes which actively participated in the festival with their mass communication students.

Photo Exhibition

The seventh edition of Bengaluru International Film Festival (BIFFes), in association with Goethe-Institut/Max Mueller Bhavan, had organized a photo exhibition called Hybrid Modernisation - Movie Theatres in South India by Sabine Haubitz and Stefanie Zoche to provides a view of the surviving single screens in south India.

The exhibition talks about the current status of single-screen theaters in the south Indian region which includes the states Kerala, Tamil Nadu, Karnataka and Andhra Pradesh between 2010 and 2013.

Here is an extensive listing of the movies screened in BIFFES 2014.

Asian cinema competition

Indian cinema competition

Kannada competition

Cinema of the world

Country focus

Fipresci

NETPAC

Retrospecitive

Premier

Gender violence

Homage

Special tribute

Recommended screenings

Centenary remembrance - Honnappa Baghavathar & Hunsur Krishnamurthy

Texts for master classes

Grand classics

Restored cinema

References

Bangalore International Film Festival
2014 film festivals
2014 festivals in Asia